Rhyll is a small fishing town on Phillip Island in Victoria, Australia. It is located in the north-east corner of the island. It is named after Rhyl, a holiday resort in Denbighshire, Wales.

The first European to arrive in the area was George Bass, who landed in 1798 to make repairs to his ship. He returned in the same year with Matthew Flinders and a memorial for this landing is maintained close to Rhyll pier.  A temporary British settlement called Flagstaff was established in 1826, and was settled in 1856.

The Post Office opened on 19 September 1889.  It operates as a central mail collection point for locals as there is no mail delivery.  It is also a General Store.

There is a boat service centre, and a three lane boat ramp which is accessible 24 hours. A daily or annual ramp ticket is required to be displayed in vehicles using the ramp.

The mangrove boardwalk of the Rhyll Inlet is a haven for pelicans, black swans, gulls and straw-necked ibis. The all-tide boat ramp is equipped with barbecues, two playgrounds, tennis courts and public toilets. Rhyll contains a general store, and accommodation includes several Bed and breakfasts, and a full range of dining is available, from a local tavern and restaurant, to breakfast dining and restaurants with take-away menus, including a Fish and chip shop.

Climate
Rhyll has an oceanic climate heavily moderated by the surrounding sea, resulting in mild summers with frequent dry spells, and moderately wet and cool winters that remain within  from summer highs on average.

References

Phillip Island
Western Port
Fishing communities in Australia
Ports and harbours of Victoria (Australia)
Towns in Victoria (Australia)
Bass Coast Shire